"No Shade in the Shadow of the Cross" is a song by American singer-songwriter and multi-instrumentalist Sufjan Stevens. It is the tenth track and lead single from his seventh studio album, Carrie & Lowell, and was released digitally on February 16, 2015 on Asthmatic Kitty and as a one-track 7" on March 3, 2015 on Joyful Noise Recordings.

Critical reception
"No Shade in the Shadow of the Cross" received very positive reviews from contemporary music critics. The song was chosen upon release as Pitchfork Media's "Best New Track". Jeremy D. Larson stated that, "Once again, Sufjan Stevens is finger-picking and whisper-singing to guide us towards cold moments of solitude and reverence. It's comforting to hear his voice again, like it's inches from the ear. "No Shade in the Shadow of the Cross" seems like a reflexive pendulum swing away from everything his challenging Age of Adz stood for. No more high-concept art statements, just old-fashioned songwriting; a man playing guitar on a stool in the corner of a café. But consider the three elements of this song: his voice, his acoustic guitar, and some white noise underneath. The last one is important. The white noise is not an affected tape hiss, but rather the fan of an air conditioner, running on high, blasting into Stevens' apartment."

References

External links
 

2015 singles
2015 songs
Asthmatic Kitty singles
Joyful Noise Recordings singles
Song recordings produced by Doveman
Sufjan Stevens songs